Emad Aoda (born 15 November 1981 in Iraq) is a coach and former international Iraqi football player, he played as a defender. he is currently working as a coach for Al-Minaa club.

International career
Emad Aoda was part of the Iraqi youth team from the start of the trail for the 2000 AFC Youth Championship playing in the qualifiers at the Rajshahi Stadium in Bangladesh, where he made one substitute appearance in the 6-0 win over the Maldives, Emad scored Iraq's 5th goal from 25- yards after nearly 25 minutes after coming on.

The defender started Iraq's first game in Tehran, Iran in the 0-0 draw with China and also replaced suspended Bassim Abbas in the 6-0 win over Pakistan, Emad made 2 substitute appearances against Korea Republic and in the semi-final win over Iran. The defender only started in the final against Japan taking the place of suspended regular Bassim Abdul-Hassan. After the final win in Tehran, he was called up into the Iraqi World Cup qualifiers squad, but he was one of many players omitted after Milan Zivadinovic was sacked and played a few matches under Bernd Stange.

Coaching career 
Aoda started managing in the Iraq leagues in March 2014. In January 2021, he was hired as manager of his sixth different club, Naft Al-Basra SC, following his second term as manager of Al-Sinaat Al-Kahrabaiya.

Managerial statistics

Honours

Club
Al-Minaa
 Iraqi Premier League: 2004–05 as a runner-up

International

Iraq U-19
AFC U-19 Championship: 2000

References

External links
 
 Emad Aoda Profile  at kooora.com (in Arabic)

Iraqi footballers
Iraqi expatriate footballers
Living people
Sportspeople from Basra
Al-Mina'a SC players
Al-Zawraa SC players
Expatriate footballers in Jordan
1976 births
Association football defenders
Al-Mina'a SC managers
Iraqi football managers
Iraq international footballers